The Bauhaus project is a software research project collaboration among the University of Stuttgart, the University of Bremen, and a commercial spin-off company Axivion  formerly called Bauhaus Software Technologies. The Bauhaus project serves the fields of software maintenance and software reengineering.

Created in response to the problem of software rot, the project aims to analyze and recover the means and methods developed for legacy software by understanding the software's architecture. As part of its research, the project develops software tools (such as the Bauhaus Toolkit) for software architecture, software maintenance and reengineering and program understanding.

The project derives its name from the former Bauhaus art school.

History
The Bauhaus project was initiated by Erhard Ploedereder, Ph.D. and Rainer Koschke, Ph.D. at the University of Stuttgart in 1996. It was originally a collaboration between the Institute for Computer Science (ICS) of the University of Stuttgart and the Fraunhofer-Institut für Experimentelles Software Engineering (IESE), which is no longer involved.

Early versions of Bauhaus integrated and used Rigi for visualization.

The commercial spin-off Axivion was started in 2005. Research then was done at Axivion, the Institute of Software Technology, Department of Programming Languages at the University of Stuttgart as well as at the Software Engineering Group of the Faculty 03 at the University of Bremen.

Today, the academic version of the Bauhaus project and the commercially sold Axivion Suite are different products, as development at Axivion since 2010 is based on a new infrastructure which allowed Axivion to add new applications such as MISRA checking.

Bauhaus Toolkit

The Bauhaus Toolkit (or simply the "Bauhaus tool") includes a static code analysis tool for C, C++, C#, Java and Ada code. It comprises various analyses such as architecture checking, interface analysis, and clone detection. Bauhaus was originally derived from the older Rigi reverse engineering environment, which was expanded by Bauhaus due to the Rigi's limitations. It is among the most notable visualization tools in the field.

The Bauhaus tool suite aids the analysis of source code by creating abstractions (representations) of the code in an intermediate language as well as through a resource flow graph (RFG). The RFG is a hierarchal graph with typed nodes and edges, which are structured in various views.

The toolkit is licensed at no charge for academic use (but this is a different product than the Axivion Suite).

Axivion and the Axivion Suite

For commercial use, the project has created a spin-off company, Axivion. Axivion is headquartered in Stuttgart, Germany and provides licensing and support for the Axivion Suite. While the Axivion Suite has its origins in the Bauhaus project, it today is a different product with a much broader range of static code analyses, such as MISRA checking, architecture verification, include analysis, defect detection, and clone management. It also provides IDE integrations for Eclipse and Microsoft Visual Studio not found in the academic project.

Project funding
The Bauhaus project was funded by the state of Baden-Württemberg, the Deutschen Forschungsgemeinschaft, the Bundesministerium für Bildung und Forschung, T-Nova Deutsche Telekom Innovationsgesellschaft Ltd., and Xerox Research.

Reception
The Bauhaus tool suite has been used successfully in research and commercial projects. It has been noted that Bauhaus is "perhaps [the] most extensive" customization of the well-known Rigi environment,

The members of the project were repeatedly awarded with Best Paper Awards and were invited to submit journal papers several times.

In 2003, the Bauhaus project received the do it software award from MFG Stiftung Baden-Württemberg.

Footnotes
 Regarding the project's founding, the years 1996 and 1997 seem to appear equally often among the various sources.

References

External links
The Bauhaus Project
University of Stuttgart, Institute of Software Technology, Department of Programming Languages
University of Bremen, Software Engineering Group, Faculty 03
Axivion company homepage (commercial licensing and support for the Axivion Suite)

Software metrics
Static program analysis tools